Eduardo de Acha y Otáñez (13 March 1878 – 30 November 1928) was a Spanish soldier (Captain of the Artillery) and Knight of the Order of Calatrava. In 1903 he was one of the main architects of the foundation of Club Athletic de Madrid (now Atlético Madrid), an entity of which he would serve as its second president between 1903 and 1907.

Early years
He was a Madrid native of Basque descent. His father, Juan Nicolás de Acha, founded the Ophthalmic Institute of Madrid, which would later be donated to the state. To thank this initiative, King Alfonso XIII appointed Alberto de Acha Marquis, eldest son of Juan Nicolás and Eduardo's older brother, with a marquess.

Foundation of Athletic
On 26 April 1903, a Basque colony of students led by Eduardo de Acha met the representatives of Athletic Club, who had just won the 1903 Copa del Rey Final on 8 April. It was he who met with the directors of the Basque club to request permission to create the Madrid branch, an idea that was very well received. Thus, De Acha organized a meeting at the Sociedad Vasco Navarra in Madrid on the night of April 25–26, 1903 to give birth to Athletic de Madrid. He appeared on the club's first board of directors as secretary, and Enrique Allende was appointed as the club's first president. Allende's appointment was the initiative of Acha, because even though he had been the main promoter and architect of the team's creation, he wanted Allende to be president due to his comfortable economic situation. However, Allende did not meet the expectations that were held of him. He soon got tired and stopped showing much interest in football, so he resigned in the fall of that same year, and Acha assumed the presidency.

Club presidency
Athletic Club helped Athletic de Madrid from the first moment, giving them uniforms, the badge and the name. In the first years, they could not participate in national tournaments due to their link with its counterpart from Bilbao, so Acha gave several of his team's best players to Athletic Club so that they could play in the tournament and in exchange for their help. Together, they won the 1904 Copa del Rey, where Athletic were declared winners without playing a match after their opponents failed to turn up.

During his presidency, Athletic made its first participation in an official tournament, in October 1906, by partaking in the Madrid Championship, whose winner would go on to the Copa del Rey as a representative of the Madrid region, except if said champion was Athletic, as they were prohibited from competing against their parent club from Bilbao. Until then, all the matches played since its foundation had been friendly games. The club got its first competitive victory on 6 December 1906, when they unexpectedly, but convincingly defeated Madrid 5–0.

Having moved its headquarters to Calle Fuencarral, Athletic Club de Madrid wanted to officially establish itself and formalize its first regulations, instead of continuing to use Bilbao's. Eduardo de Acha drafted a statute to obtain legal personality, in accordance with the law of associations of 30 June 1887, drawing up the club's own statutes, so on 20 February 1907, the club officially disassociated itself from Athletic Club de Bilbao to register in the official registry of associations.

With the club's independence, a new board of directors was elected and Acha resigned from his position on 20 February 1907, the same day that Atlético got their independence when they stopped being a branch of the classic Basque club, with Ricardo de Gondra, another of the club's founders, taking over the presidency. His link with the club continued, although with different intensity, until 1923.

At the same time, De Acha developed a career as a soldier and became captain of the artillery and a member of the Order of Calatrava.

Death
He married Manuela Sánchez-Arjona y Velasco (12 August 1887 – 23 April 1957), daughter of the 1st Marquis of Casa Arjona and twice great-granddaughter of the 2nd Marquis of Ríocabado, and had six children and daughters. Eduardo de Acha died in Madrid on Saint Andrew's Day (November 30) of 1928, at the age of 50.

References

President of Atlético Madrid
1878 births
1928 deaths
Footballers from Madrid
Spanish footballers
Association football midfielders
Atlético Madrid footballers
Order of Calatrava